NIAF may refer to:

National Italian American Foundation
National Iraqi Armed Forces